Chrysolina quadrigemina is a beetle of the family Chrysomelidae.

The species was described by Suffrian in 1851. It is native to Europe and North Africa.

It feeds on Hypericum perforatum and other members of the genus. This plant is an introduced invasive pest in North America and Australia. The beetle was introduced in these regions as a biological control.

References 

Chrysomelinae
Biological pest control
Taxa named by Christian Wilhelm Ludwig Eduard Suffrian
Beetles described in 1851